East Fork State Park is  public recreation area located around the East Fork of the Little Miami River in Clermont County,  southeast of central Cincinnati, Ohio, in the United States. It maintains the 33-mile "Steve Newman World-Walker" perimeter trail, camping, hiking, swimming, and boating opportunities. The state park has hosted junior and collegiate rowing races, including the US Rowing Youth National Championships. The park's main feature is William H. Harsha Lake, a  reservoir created in 1978. The lake's large earthen dam and smaller saddle dams are operated by the U.S. Army Corps of Engineers.

Fish found in the lake include largemouth bass, smallmouth bass, Kentucky spotted bass, bluegill, white crappie, black crappie, channel catfish, flathead catfish, bigmouth buffalofish, carp, and hybrid striped bass.

References

External links
East Fork State Park Ohio Department of Natural Resources
East Fork State Park Map Ohio Department of Natural Resources 
William H. Harsha Lake Louisville District, U.S. Army Corps of Engineers

State parks of Ohio
Protected areas of Clermont County, Ohio
Protected areas established in 1978
1978 establishments in Ohio